Crush is the second studio album by British electronic musician Sam Shepherd, released under his alias Floating Points on 18 October 2019 by Ninja Tune.

Background and recording
Shepherd began work on the album following a 2017 tour with the xx. Taking inspiration from German krautrock band Harmonia's 2007 album Live 1974, Shepherd played 30 minute improvisational sets using only a Buchla synthesizer and a Korg drum machine. Upon his return to the studio, Shepherd used the same equipment as the basis for recording and completed the album in  five weeks. Unlike the debut Floating Points album Elaenia (2015), Crush does not feature any live guitars or drums.

Critical reception

Crush received positive reception upon release. At Metacritic, which assigns a normalized rating out of 100 to reviews from music publications, the album received an average score of 81 based on 16 reviews, indicating "universal acclaim". Shawn Reynaldo of Pitchfork awarded the album "Best New Music", saying that the project is "an album of mischievous, melodic, stripped-down electronic music". Dylan Barnabe at Exclaim! noted that although "the sonic explorations undermine the album's overall cohesiveness, Crush remains a shining example of Shepherd's growth as an artist". In a mixed review, John Mulvey of Mojo thought that the project was "a decent album, but perhaps not the one some of us were hoping for.".

Accolades

Track listing
All tracks written and produced by Sam Shepherd. Credits adapted from Apple Music and Tidal.

Charts

References

2019 albums
Floating Points albums
Ninja Tune albums